Peter Olotka is a game designer who has worked primarily on board games, most notably Cosmic Encounter.

Career
In 1972, Peter Olotka, Jack Kittredge, Bill Eberle, and Bill Norton came together as the game design cooperative Future Pastimes. Seeking to publish their board game Cosmic Encounter, they met Ned Horn, who offered to invest in the game; several weeks later, Olotka, Kittredge, Eberle, and Horn created a new company, Eon Products, and Cosmic Encounter went to press in 1977. Additionally, Allen Varney of Dragon Magazine claimed Olotka mentioned the idea of creating a collectible card game as early as 1979. Eberle, Kittredge, and Olotka designed Star Trek: The Enterprise 4 Encounter (1985), a board game that mixes combat and set collection, for West End Games. The trio also designed the 1979 Dune board game set in Frank Herbert's fantasy novels.

Olotka released Cosmic Encounter Online in 2003, a high-tech Flash version of Eon's original game.

References

Board game designers
Living people
Year of birth missing (living people)